Kazemabad (also Romanized as Kāz̧emābād) is a village in Ordughesh Rural District, Zeberkhan District, Nishapur County, Razavi Khorasan Province, Iran. At the 2006 census, its population was 25, in 5 families.

References 

Populated places in Nishapur County